East Halton is a small village and civil parish in North Lincolnshire, England.

The 2001 census recorded a population of 604 people, increasing to 626 at the 2011 census.

East Halton Grade I listed Anglican church is dedicated to St Peter. It originated in the 13th century, and was restored by James Fowler of Louth in 1868, who raised the chancel and aisle. The village had Wesleyan and Primitive Methodist chapels.

The village has a primary school, village shop and post office, and the Black Bull public house.

East Halton was previously served by East Halton railway station on the New Holland and Immingham Dock branch of the Great Central Railway.

References

External links

"East Halton", Genuki.org.uk. Retrieved 23 July 2011

Villages in the Borough of North Lincolnshire
Civil parishes in Lincolnshire